Iota1 Librae, Latinized from ι1 Librae, is a quadruple star system in the constellation Libra. Its apparent magnitude is 4.54. It is located 379 light years from earth.

Visibility 
Due to its southern location, although the star can be seen from most regions of the earth, observers in the southern hemisphere are more advantaged. Near Antarctica, it appears circumpolar, while it always remains invisible only in the vicinity of the Arctic Circle. Its magnitude of 4.5 means that naked-eye visibility is dependent on a sky sufficiently free from the effects of light pollution.

The best time for observation in the evening sky falls in the months between May and September; from both hemispheres of the period of visibility remains approximately the same, thanks to the position of the star not far from the celestial equator.

Physical 

Iota1 Librae is a four star system. The inner pair, designated components Aa and Ab, form a spectroscopic binary with an orbital period of 22.35 years and an eccentricity of 0.35. It is a variable star of the Alpha2 Canum Venaticorum type with a magnitude that varies from 4.53 to 4.56, while its spectrum likewise shows variability. The secondary component is of class B9. The two stars are very close together (0.2 arcsec away), respectively of magnitude 5.1 and 5.5.

A third component is located 57 arcsec distant; it is a star of the tenth magnitude, Iota1 Librae B. The third component is also a double star, of equal magnitudes, 1.9 arcseconds apart.

Due to its position on the ecliptic, it is sometimes obscured by the Moon or planets. A lunar occultation took place April 4, 2012.

References

External links 
 Simbad archive

Libra (constellation)
B-type subgiants
Librae, Iota1
Alpha2 Canum Venaticorum variables
4
Librae, 24
Durchmusterung objects
074392
134759
5652